The Yonghe Temple ("Palace of Peace and Harmony"), also known as the Yonghe Lamasery, or popularly as the Lama Temple, is a temple and monastery of the Gelug school of Tibetan Buddhism located on 12 Yonghegong Street, Dongcheng District, Beijing, China. The building and artwork of the temple is a combination of Han Chinese and Tibetan styles. This building is one of the largest Tibetan Buddhist monasteries in China proper. The current abbot is Lama Hu Xuefeng.

Yonghe Temple, because Emperor Qianlong was born here, there were two emperors in Yonghe Temple. It became the center of the Qing government in charge of Tibetan Buddhism affairs across the country. Yonghe Temple is the highest Buddhist temple in the country in the middle and late Qing Dynasty.

History 
Building work on the Yonghe Temple started in 1694 during the Qing dynasty on the site where originally stood an official residence for court eunuchs of the Ming dynasty. It was then converted into the residence of Yinzhen (Prince Yong), the fourth son of the Kangxi Emperor. The Kangxi Emperor awarded this building to Yinzhen in 1702, who was at the time a junwang (second-rank prince). Yinzhen moved into this building in May 1703. The Kangxi Emperor promoted Yinzhen from junwang to qinwang (first-rank prince) under the title "Prince Yong of the First Rank" (和硕雍亲王; 和碩雍親王; Héshuò Yōng Qīnwáng; Manchu: hošoi hūwaliyasun cin wang) in 1709. The name of this building was thus changed into 'the Residence of Prince Yong of the First Rank' (雍親王府) in the same year. In 1711, Hongli, the fourth son of Yongzheng, the future Qianlong emperor, was born in the East Academy (东书院) in this building.

Prince Yong ascended the throne as the Yongzheng Emperor in 1722, and the Residence of Prince Yong of the First Rank was later promoted into the 'Palace of Peace and Harmony' (雍和宫). After the Yongzheng Emperor's death in 1735, his coffin was placed in the temple from 1735 to 1737. Before the Yonghe Temple was converted into a monastery, the Grand Secretariat Ortai had once proposed that Hongzhou (Prince He) should take the Yonghe Palace as his private residence, but this suggestion was denied by the Qianlong Emperor. The Qianlong Emperor, who succeeded the Yongzheng Emperor, gave the temple imperial status signified by having its turquoise tiles replaced with yellow tiles which were reserved for the emperor. In 1744, the Qianlong Emperor issued an edict of converting the Palace of Peace and Harmony into a lamasery, and the following Buddhābhiṣeka (开光 Kaiguang) of the Buddhist figure was executed in 1745.

Subsequently, the monastery became a residence for large numbers of Tibetan Buddhist monks from Mongolia and Tibet, and so the Yonghe Lamasery became the national centre of Lama administration. Since 1792, with the foundation of the Golden Urn, the Yonghe Temple also became a place for the Manchu government to exert control over the Tibetan and Mongolian lama reincarnations.

The temple was the site of an armed revolt against the Chinese Nationalist government in 1929.

After the Chinese Civil War ended in 1949, the temple was declared a national monument and closed for the following 32 years. It is said to have survived the Cultural Revolution due to the intervention of Premier Zhou Enlai. Reopened to the public in 1981, it is today both a functioning temple and highly popular tourist attraction in the city.

Administration 
After the Yonghegong Temple was converted into a monastery, its management can be divided into two parts: administrative affairs management and religious affairs management. In terms of administration, the Yonghe Temple is treated as an imperial Tibetan Buddhist temple directly under the jurisdiction of the Qing Dynasty. The emperor would appoint a prince or a junwang (second-rank prince) as the responsible of the temple's secular business, and delegate the actual management affairs to the Imperial Household Department and the Ministry of Foreign Affairs. The religious affair of the Yonghe Temple is handled by a Khenpo lama （管理雍和宫总堪布喇嘛） as the head of the monastery. This position is usually held by lamas from Tibet, and is higher in status than the usual Zhasake (Manchu: jasak i da lama) lamas. It is worth noting that since 1936, the term used to address the religious head of the Yonghe Temple has changed from khenpo to abbot (CN: 住持）

Layout 
(Please see the map attached)

Memorial Archway
Imperial Carriage Pathway
Toilet 
Zhaotai Gate 
Drum tower 
Bell tower
West Stele Pavilion 
East Stele Pavilion 
West Ase Gate 
East Ase Gate  
Yonghe Gate Hall 
Four-Language Stele Pavilion 
Exoteric Hall 
Esoteric Hall 
Shilun Hall 
Medicine Hall 
Yonghegong Hal 
Yongyou Hall 
West Side Hall 
Eate Side Hall 
Falun Hall 
Jietai Building 
Panchen Building 
Wanfuge Pavilion  
Yansui Pavilion 
Yongkang Pavilion 
Yamudaga Building  
Zhaofo Building 
Suicheng Hall 
West Shunshan Building  
East Shunshan Building 
The Residence of A Jia Rinpoche 
Souvenir store  
Ticket Center 
Reception 
Tourist Center 
Buddhābhiṣeka Center

Architecture and artworks

The Yonghe Temple is arranged along a north–south central axis, which has a length of 480 metres, and covers an area of 66,400 square meters. The main gate, the Gate of Clarity and Prosperity (Zhaotaimen) is at the southern end of this axis, along with three memorial archways in the front. And a path built for imperial carriages (Niandao) is situated between the front memorial archway and the Gate of Clarity and Prosperity. Along the axis, there are five main halls which are separated by courtyards: the Gate Hall of Harmony and Peace (Yonghemendian), the Hall of Harmony and Peace (Yonghegong), the Hall of Everlasting Protection (Yongyoudian), the Hall of the Wheel of the Law (Falundian), and the Pavilion of Ten Thousand Happinesses (Wanfuge).

The Gate Hall of Harmony and Peace is the southernmost of the main halls, it served originally as the main entrance of the palace, but was later changed into the Hall of Heavenly Kings (Tianwangdian). In the center of the hall stands a statue of the Maitreya Buddha, along the walls statues of the four Heavenly Kings are arranged. There sit two stele pavilions in front of the Gate Hall of Harmony and Peace, which contain the stele of the Yonghe Temple and the stele of the Discourse of Lamas.

The Hall of Harmony and Peace is the main building of the temple. It houses three bronze statues of the Buddhas of the Three Ages, the statue of the Gautama Buddha (Buddha of the Present) is in the center, it is flanked by the statue of Dīpankara Buddha (Buddha of the Past, right) and the Maitreya Buddha (Buddha of the Future, left). Along the sides of the hall, the statues of the 18 Arhats are placed. A mural in the hall shows the bodhisattva Avalokitesvara.

The Hall of Everlasting Protection was Emperor Yongzheng's living quarters as a prince and the place where his coffin was placed after his death. Today, a statue of the Bhaisajya-guru (healing Buddha) stands in this hall.

The Hall of the Wheel of the Law functions as a place for reading scriptures and conducting religious ceremonies. It contains a large statue of Je Tsongkhapa, founder of the Geluk School. The hall also contains the Five-Hundred-Arhat-Hill, a carving made of red sandalwood with statues of the arhats made from five different metals (gold, silver, copper, iron, and tin).

The Pavilion of Ten Thousand Happinesses (sometimes referred to as "The Hall of Boundless Happiness") contains an 18m tall (with an additional 8m underground, making it 26m in total) statue of the Maitreya Buddha carved from a single piece of White Sandalwood. This was a gift from the seventh Dalai Lama to the Qianlong Emperor and took three years to transport from Tibet to Beijing. The statue is one of three artworks in the Temple which were included in the Guinness Book of Records in 1993.

Three fabulous artworks
 three bronze statues of the Buddhas of the Three Ages
 Five-Hundred-Arhat-Hill
 18m tall White Sandalwood statue of the Maitreya Buddha

Two Steles 
The Yonghe Temple contains two steles built during the reign of the Qianlong Emperor. Both of them are written in Chinese, Manchu, Tibetan, and Mongolian. The first one is the Yonghegong Stele, erected in 1744, signaling the palace's conversion into a lama monastery. The second one is The Discourse of Lama, a stele erected in 1792, which is written by the Qianlong Emperor to target the wrongdoing of the Tibetan lamas in handling the reincarnation issues. Both steles are well-preserved in the two pavilions in front of the Yonghe Gate.

Cham Dance 
Being a Tibetan Buddhist temple, the Yonghe temple also inherits rituals and dances from Tibet. The temple has adopted the tradition of the cham dance, or bujak in Manchu, shortly after its conversion into a lama monastery. The first record of the practice of cham dance in Yonghe Temple was first found in 1746,  at a banquet hosted by the Qianlong emperor in hosting a Dzunggar envoy. This ritual is hosted on every 28th day of the 12th lunar month and the fourth day of the first lunar month in the period after its foundation. During the reign of the Guangxu Emperor, the tradition was rescheduled as an eight-day performance starts from the 23rd of the first lunar year to the 1st of the second lunar year. Due to the closure of the Yonghe Temple in the Cultural Revolution period, the cham dance was also suspended. It was not revived until 1987.

Location
The Yonghe Temple is located in Beijing's Dongcheng District, near the northeastern corner of the Second Ring Road. The postal address is: 12 Yonghegong Dajie, Beixinqiao, Dongcheng District, Beijing. The Yonghe Temple and the Forbidden City are about five kilometers apart, about an hour's walk away.

Transport
Lines 2 and 5 of the Beijing Subway both stop at Yonghegong Lama Temple station, as do a number of city buses.

Gallery

Further reading
Lessing, Ferdinand, and Gösta Montell. Yung-Ho-Kung, an Iconography of the Lamaist Cathedral in Peking: With Notes on Lamaist Mythology and Cult. Stockholm: 1942.

References 

Lonely Planet Beijing 10th Edition (Oakland, CA: Lonely Planet Publications, 2007), 134.

External links

Official Yonghe Temple website—
Beijingtrip.com:  Yonghe Lama Temple
GoogleMaps: Satellite photo of the Yonghe Temple — centered on the Hall of Everlasting Protection.
Tibet.cn:  "Beijing Lama Temple donates Buddha statue to Mongolia" —

Tibetan Buddhist temples in Beijing
Gelug monasteries and temples
Tibetan Buddhist temples
Dongcheng District, Beijing
Qing dynasty architecture
Major National Historical and Cultural Sites in Beijing
Houses completed in 1694
1694 establishments in China
Religious organizations established in 1722
18th-century Buddhist temples
1720s establishments in China
Tibetan Buddhism in Asia
Maitreya